Nerf Herder is the eponymous debut album by Nerf Herder, originally released in November 1996 and produced by Joey Cape and Ryan Greene.

The album was released as two nearly identical versions by two different labels—both in 1996. The first version was released by independent label My Records (owned by Joey Cape from Lagwagon) as the label's debut album. The second version was a reissue by major label Arista Records with slightly different inner artwork, redesigned disc artwork, and an alternate version of the song "Easy Mark." Using the original recording, the song's verses and bridge were rewritten and re-recorded because of similarities to lyrics from "Don't Stop Believin'" by Journey.

Track listing

References

1996 debut albums
Arista Records albums
Nerf Herder albums
Albums produced by Joey Cape
Albums produced by Ryan Greene